Ylistrum is a genus of marine bivalve mollusks in the family Pectinidae, the scallops.

Species
Species in the genus Ylistrum 
 Ylistrum balloti (Bernardi, 1861)
 Ylistrum japonicum (Gmelin, 1791)

References

Pectinidae
Bivalve genera